Demétrius Montanini (born 18 March 1971), sometimes known as just Demétrius, is a retired Brazilian professional footballer who played as a striker.

Demétrius Montanini was part of the Campomaiorense side who reached the final of the 1998–99 Taça de Portugal.

Honours
Remo
 Campeonato Paraense: 1995

Campomaiorense
 Taça de Portugal: Runner-up 1998–99

Boavista
 Primeira Liga: 2000–01

References

External links
 

1971 births
Living people
Footballers from São Paulo
Brazilian footballers
Association football forwards
Campeonato Brasileiro Série B players
Botafogo Futebol Clube (SP) players
Campeonato Brasileiro Série A players
Santos FC players
Clube do Remo players
Fluminense FC players
Associação Atlética Portuguesa (Santos) players
Esporte Clube Bahia players
Primeira Liga players
S.C. Campomaiorense players
Boavista F.C. players
S.C. Beira-Mar players
Moreirense F.C. players
Comercial Futebol Clube (Ribeirão Preto) players
Expatriate footballers in Portugal
Brazilian expatriates in Portugal